Lauren J. Krivo is an American sociologist who is professor of sociology at Rutgers University, where she is also an affiliated professor in the Program in Criminal Justice. She is also the director of graduate studies in Rutgers' sociology department. She is known for her work on residential segregation and disadvantage as they relate to race and crime in the United States. She co-founded the Racial Democracy, Crime, and Justice Network, a national network of scholars dedicated to researching race, crime, and justice, along with her longtime collaborator Ruth D. Peterson.

Books

Co-authored
Divergent Social Worlds (with Ruth D. Peterson) (Russell Sage, 2010)

Co-edited
The Many Colors of Crime: Inequalities of Race, Ethnicity, and Crime in America (with Ruth D. Peterson and John L. Hagan) (NYU Press, 2006)
Race, Crime, and Justice: Contexts and Complexities (with Ruth D. Peterson) (May 2009 volume of the Annals of the American Academy of Political and Social Science)

References

External links
Faculty page at Rutgers Department of Sociology
Faculty page at Rutgers Program in Criminal Justice

American women social scientists
Living people
American criminologists
Rutgers University faculty
Washington University in St. Louis alumni
University of Texas at Austin alumni
American women criminologists
Year of birth missing (living people)